Shanghai Rose is a 1929 American silent action film directed by Scott Pembroke and starring Irene Rich, William Conklin and Ruth Hiatt.

Cast
 Irene Rich as Shanghai Rose 
 William Conklin as Henry West 
 Richard Walling as Gregor West 
 Ruth Hiatt as Diane Avery 
 Tony Merlo as Ivan Kahn 
 Syd Saylor as Xavier Doolittle 
 Robert Dudley as Reformer 
 De Sacia Mooers as Mrs. Doolittle

References

Bibliography
 Bell, Geoffrey. The Golden Gate and the Silver Screen. Associated University Presse, 1984.

External links

1929 films
1920s action films
American action films
Films directed by Scott Pembroke
American silent feature films
Rayart Pictures films
American black-and-white films
Films set in San Francisco
1920s English-language films
1920s American films
Silent action films